Frederick Charles Gordon (June 30, 1856 – March 20, 1924) was an early 20th century Canadian illustrator who was a staff artist for Century magazine and also illustrated books.

Biography
Frederick Charles Gordon was born in Cobourg, Ontario in 1856, and received his early artistic training in Paris, France, at the Académie Julian and the Académie Colarossi. On his return to Canada, he moved to Brockville and taught art at the Brockville Business College for a time. 

In 1886, Gordon moved to New York City for further art training at the Art Students League. He became a staff artist for Century magazine and created some covers for The Outlook magazine. He also illustrated books by authors such as Clara D. Pierson, Ian Maclaren, Nathaniel Hawthorne, and Ruth Ogden. 

In 1908 he moved to Westfield, New Jersey, where he served as mayor for five years (1916–21). He died of a heart attack in 1924.

References

External links

1856 births
1924 deaths
Canadian illustrators
People from Cobourg
Canadian children's book illustrators
Académie Colarossi alumni
Académie Julian alumni